Edward Steers, Jr., had a prominent career as a scientist before he retired and began writing full time.  This American historian is a noted authority on U.S. President Abraham Lincoln. Steers has received awards in both the fields of scientific research and history.

Career
Born in Bethlehem, Pennsylvania, Edward Steers gained an early appreciation for science by attending classes as a young boy taught by his father, who headed the Science Department at Moravian College.  Steers received his AB degree in Microbiology in 1959 and his PhD in Molecular Biology in 1963 from the University of Pennsylvania in Philadelphia and joined the staff of the  National Institutes of Health (1963-1994). Recruited out of graduate school by Nobel Laureate (Chemistry) Christian B. Anfinsen, Steers learned his research skills working alongside one of the world’s leading biochemists. From 1966 to 1986 Steers served as an Adjunct Professor in the Department of Biochemistry at the George Washington University School of Medicine.  From 1984 to 1994 he served as the Deputy Scientific Director for Intramural Research in the National Institute of Diabetes and Digestive Diseases and Kidney Diseases.

After his retirement in 1994, Steers turned his research skills to full-time writing in the field of history. He has published numerous articles and more than 26 books, including titles on topics as diverse as WWII and Abraham Lincoln.  Steers is also fascinated by dissecting fraudulent claims appearing in popular history, publishing books such as Hoax, Lincoln Legends: Myths, Hoaxes, and Confabulations Associated With Our Greatest President,  and Getting Right with Lincoln: Correcting Misconceptions about our Greatest President.

Edward Steers is recognized as a leading authority on Abraham Lincoln and the assassination of Abraham Lincoln. He has authored or edited more than a dozen books on Lincoln’s life and death including Lincoln, The Quotable Lincoln, Blood on the Moon, The Lincoln Assassination Conspirators, His Name is Still Mudd, The Trial, The Lincoln Assassination: The Evidence, Lincoln Legends, and The Lincoln Assassination Encyclopedia.  His book Blood on the Moon alleges that the Confederate Secret Service was intimately involved with John Wilkes Booth ultimately leading to the assassination of President Lincoln. His book His Name Is Still Mudd presents the case for Dr. Samuel Mudd's complicity with John Wilkes Booth's plot to capture President Lincoln ultimately leading to his assassination.

Among his honors, Steers was elected to American Men and Women of Science, and as a Fellow in the Company of Military Historians. He served as Review Editor for the Lincoln Herald, and he is an Associate Editor of North & South magazine. Steers was appointed to the West Virginia Abraham Lincoln Bicentennial Commission (appointed by Governor Joe Manchin) and the Abraham Lincoln Bicentennial Commission Advisory Board (appointed by Senator Richard Durbin). For his historical writing Steers was awarded the Lincoln Group of New York’s "Award of Achievement", the Lincoln Group of the District of Columbia’s "Man of the Year Award",  and The Lincoln Forum’s "Richard Nelson Current Award of Achievement".

Books

Steers is the author of a number of books, including:

 
 
 
 
 
 
 
 
 
 Hoax. Hitler's Diaries, Lincoln's Assassins, and other Famous Frauds. University Press of Kentucky. 2013. .

References

External links
 
 

Historians of the American Civil War
21st-century American historians
21st-century American male writers
Living people
Year of birth missing (living people)
American male non-fiction writers
Writers from Bethlehem, Pennsylvania
Scientists from Pennsylvania